Víctor J. Frattini Bononi (born 19 February 1956) is an Uruguayan former basketball player who competed in the 1984 Summer Olympics.

References

External links

1956 births
Living people
Uruguayan men's basketball players
1982 FIBA World Championship players
Olympic basketball players of Uruguay
Basketball players at the 1984 Summer Olympics
Uruguayan people of Italian descent